The vapour pressure of water is the pressure exerted by molecules of water vapor in gaseous form (whether pure or in a mixture with other gases such as air). The saturation vapour pressure is the pressure at which water vapour is in thermodynamic equilibrium with its condensed state. At pressures higher than vapour pressure, water would condense, whilst at lower pressures it would evaporate or sublimate.  The saturation vapour pressure of water increases with increasing temperature and can be determined with the Clausius–Clapeyron relation. The boiling point of water is the temperature at which the saturated vapour pressure equals the ambient pressure. 

Calculations of the (saturation) vapour pressure of water are commonly used in meteorology. The temperature-vapour pressure relation inversely describes the relation between the boiling point of water and the pressure. This is relevant to both pressure cooking and cooking at high altitude. An understanding of vapour pressure is also relevant in explaining high altitude breathing and cavitation.

Approximation formulas 

There are many published approximations for calculating saturated vapour pressure over water and over ice. Some of these are (in approximate order of increasing accuracy):

Accuracy of different formulations

Here is a comparison of the accuracies of these different explicit formulations, showing saturation vapour pressures for liquid water in kPa, calculated at six temperatures with their percentage error from the table values of Lide (2005):

{| class="wikitable"
|- align="center"
!  (°C) !!  (Lide Table) !!  (Eq 1) !!  (Antoine) !!  (Magnus) !!  (Tetens) !!  (Buck) !!  (Goff-Gratch)
|- align="center"
|  0 ||0.6113||0.6593  (+7.85%)||0.6056  (-0.93%)||0.6109  (-0.06%)||0.6108  (-0.09%)||0.6112  (-0.01%)||0.6089  (-0.40%)
|- align="center"
| 20 ||2.3388||2.3755  (+1.57%) ||2.3296  (-0.39%) ||2.3334  (-0.23%)||2.3382  (+0.05%)||2.3383  (-0.02%)||2.3355  (-0.14%) 
|- align="center"
| 35 ||5.6267||5.5696  (-1.01%) ||5.6090  (-0.31%) ||5.6176  (-0.16%)||5.6225  (+0.04%)||5.6268  (+0.00%)||5.6221  (-0.08%)
|- align="center"
| 50 ||12.344||12.065  (-2.26%) ||12.306  (-0.31%) ||12.361  (+0.13%)||12.336  (+0.08%)||12.349  (+0.04%)||12.338  (-0.05%)
|- align="center"
| 75 ||38.563||37.738  (-2.14%) ||38.463  (-0.26%) ||39.000  (+1.13%)||38.646  (+0.40%)||38.595  (+0.08%)||38.555  (-0.02%)
|- align="center"
| 100 ||101.32||101.31  (-0.01%) ||101.34  (+0.02%) ||104.077  (+2.72%)||102.21  (+1.10%)||101.31  (-0.01%)||101.32  (0.00%)
|}

A more detailed discussion of accuracy and considerations of the inaccuracy in temperature measurements is presented in Alduchov and Eskridge (1996). The analysis here shows the simple unattributed formula and the Antoine equation are reasonably accurate at 100 °C, but quite poor for lower temperatures above freezing. Tetens is much more accurate over the range from 0 to 50 °C and very competitive at 75 °C, but Antoine's is superior at 75 °C and above. The unattributed formula must have zero error at around 26 °C, but is of very poor accuracy outside a very narrow range. Tetens' equations are generally much more accurate and arguably simpler for use at everyday temperatures (e.g., in meteorology). As expected, Buck's equation for  > 0 °C is significantly more accurate than Tetens, and its superiority increases markedly above 50 °C, though it is more complicated to use. The Buck equation is even superior to the more complex Goff-Gratch equation over the range needed for practical meteorology.

Numerical approximations

For serious computation, Lowe (1977) developed two pairs of equations for temperatures above and below freezing, with different levels of accuracy. They are all very accurate (compared to Clausius-Clapeyron and the Goff-Gratch) but use nested polynomials for very efficient computation. However, there are more recent reviews of possibly superior formulations, notably Wexler (1976, 1977), reported by Flatau et al. (1992).

Examples of modern use of these formulae can additionally be found in NASA's GISS Model-E and Seinfeld and Pandis (2006). The former is an extremely simple Antoine equation, while the latter is a polynomial.

Graphical pressure dependency on temperature

See also
Dew point
Gas laws
Lee–Kesler method
Molar mass

References

Further reading

External links

Thermodynamic properties
Atmospheric thermodynamics